Ken Samaras (born 3 April 1990), better known by his stage name Nekfeu, is a French rapper, actor and record producer. He is also a member of the crew L'entourage and the bands $-Crew and 1995. He started his career as a member of $-Crew, with childhood friends Framal, Mekra, 2zer Washington and DJ Elite. He joined 1995 in 2007, participating in open mic duels around Paris.

Early life and career
Samaras was born in La Trinité, a commune within the Nice metropolitan area, to a father of Greek descent and a mother of Scottish descent. At the age of 11, he and his family moved to the 15th arrondissement of Paris.

After two extended plays with 1995 (Aurélie in 2011 and Anais in 2012), as well as the studio album Paris Sud Minute in 2013, Nekfeu released his debut studio album Feu on 8 June 2015, for which he won Best Urban Music Album at the Victoires de la musique in February 2016, as well as Destins Liés with $-Crew in June 2016. In 2015, he also wrote and performed a song for the French version of the film Creed. In 2016, he released his second album entitled Cyborg.

In 2017, he made his acting debut in the film Tout nous sépare, opposite Catherine Deneuve.

In 2019, he released his third album “les étoiles vagabondes”. The album premiered in cinemas, as a movie accompanied the album. The movie premiered 2h before the album was made available on streaming platforms. The album was extremely well received. It Included a song featuring mainstream Belgian rapper Damso (Tricheur), and many other songs entered the top 20 in the French charts.

Personal life
Nekfeu is a follower of Paris Saint-Germain, based in the city where he grew up, and his hometown club OGC Nice.

Discography

Albums, mixtapes and EPs
As part of 1995
2011: La Source (EP)
2012: La Suite (EP)
2013: Paris Sud Minute (Album)

With Alpha Wann (member of 1995 & L'Entourage)
2011: En Sous-Marin (EP)

As part of $-Crew
2010: Même Signature (Mixtape)
2012: Métamorphose (Mixtape)
2013: Seine Zoo 仙豆 (Album)
2016: Destins Liés (Album)
2022: SZR2001 (Album)

As part of L'Entourage
2014: Jeunes Entrepreneurs (Album)

As part of 5 Majeur
2011: 5 Majeur (EP)
2013: Variations (Album)

Solo

Singles

Featured in

Other charted songs

Filmography

Film
 2017 : Tout nous sépare, directed by Thierry Klifa
 2019 : L'Échappée, directed by Mathias Pardo

Television
 2015 : Casting(s) (Television series, one episode : guest appearance as himself)
 2019 : My Hero Academia (Dubbing the character All for One in the French version)

References

External links

1990 births
Living people
French rappers
French people of Greek descent
French people of Scottish descent
People from Alpes-Maritimes
Rappers from Paris